Lumbri is a village in the Punjab province of Pakistan. It is located at 30°39'50N 73°46'30E with an altitude of 169 metres (557 feet).

References

Villages in Punjab, Pakistan